Wuzhou Xijiang Airport  is an airport serving the city of Wuzhou in Guangxi Zhuang Autonomous Region, China. It is located south of the Xijiang river in the town of Tangbu in Teng County,  from the city center.

The airport received approval from the State Council of China on 29 June 2014. Construction began in 2016 and the airport was opened on 23 January 2019, replacing the older Wuzhou Changzhoudao Airport. The airport cost 1.765 billion yuan to build.

Facilities
The airport has a  runway (class 4C) and an  terminal building. It is projected to handle 750,000 passengers and 6,000 tons of cargo annually by 2025.

Airlines and destinations

See also
List of airports in China
List of the busiest airports in China

References

Airports in Guangxi
Airports established in 2019
Wuzhou
2019 establishments in China